Miguel/Michelle is a 1998 Filipino drama film starring Romnick Sarmenta and Gloria Diaz which tells a story about a man who leaves the Philippines and comes back as a woman, challenging her family to reexamine their feelings about homosexuality/transsexuality along with family values and religion.

Plot
Miguel, a young man from Quezon province, leaves the Philippines for the U.S. After seven years, he returns home, and his family discovers he has had a sex change operation and is now Michelle. Her father is stunned by this development, and other hostile reactions erupt. She declares she will stay until her family accepts her. She has also caused a crisis for an old friend who was going to get married without ever admitting he was gay. Michelle's bravery makes him think again.

Cast
Romnick Sarmenta as Miguel/Michelle de la Cruz 
Gloria Diaz as Tinang 
Ray Ventura as Nano 
Cris Villanueva as Julio 
Mylene Dizon as Sonia 
Gandong Cervantes as Fr. Rav

External links
 

1998 films
1998 LGBT-related films
Philippine LGBT-related films
1990s Tagalog-language films
Films about trans women
Films directed by Gil Portes